The 1903 Petrol Electric Autocars were built by the North Eastern Railway in 1903 at their carriage works in York. These were powered by petrol engines which generated electricity for two traction motors which were mounted on the bogie underneath. This means of powering a railway vehicle was pioneering and would eventually be developed into the diesel-electric technology that powered and powers many locomotives worldwide. The rest of the vehicles' length was taken up by a vestibule, driving compartment and a 52-seat passenger compartment.

Powertrain

Various petrol engines were used, an 85 hp Napier engine was the first to be installed, but these were found to be unsatisfactory, so were replaced in 1904 by Wolseley engines. These flat-four engines produced 92 bhp at their normal rated speed of 400 rpm, and well over 100 bhp when run at 480 rpm. The cylinders were 8.5 inch diameter with 10 inch stroke. The engine had a 3-foot diameter flywheel, and was coupled directly to a Westinghouse multi-polar dynamo. A small dynamo driven by belt from the flywheel provided charge for the accumulators which enabled electric starting of the engine, lighting for the carriage, and the 'exciting current' for the field coils in the main dynamo, controlled by rheostats at either end of the railcar. The engine speed could likewise be controlled via a throttle from either end of the railcar. The output from the main dynamo was sent to two electric motors, both mounted on the bogie underneath the engine room.

In 1923, No. 3170 was re-engined with a more powerful 225 hp engine, allowing it to haul an unpowered coach, an early version of the multiple units used today. Maximum speed was only 36 mph but acceleration and braking to and from this was reported to be brisk, taking around 30 seconds. In 1908, a pair of seats were removed to enlarge the vestibules, reducing the seating accommodation to 48. In appearance, the railcars were similar to single-deck trams. The NER called them autocars, as they could be driven from either end, as with modern passenger trains.

Service
The railcars worked briefly on Teesside, then in Yorkshire for the rest of their working lives, on lines round Scarborough, Harrogate and Selby. No. 3171 was withdrawn on 31 May 1930 and no. 3170 on 4 April 1931.

Preservation 

The body of no. 3170 was used as a holiday home near Kirbymoorside in North Yorkshire for 70 years and was bought by a railway enthusiast in 2003. A trust was formed to restore the vehicle and a trailer coach to form an Edwardian multiple unit that will be twice as old as most of the (ex-BR) DMUs on other heritage railways.

There are several changes to the autocar, to reflect changes in railway technology and regulation. The power unit is based around a new diesel engine from Cummins and the chassis is a strengthened conversion of one from a GNR milk and brake van. The work done to the chassis has been meant substantial delay and expense, but is a vital part of the project.

To achieve its aim of restoring the autocar back to working order and restore the trailer coach to go with it, the NER 1903 Electric Autocar Trust has been awarded several grants. The largest grant was awarded in March 2011 from the Heritage Lottery Fund for a total of £465,800. PRISM (the fund for the PReservation of Industrial and Scientific Material) also awarded the project £20,000 for the restoration of the bodywork of the two vehicles, and the Ken Hoole Trust awarded the project £5,000, which has gone towards the restoration of the woodwork. In December 2014, the Transport Trust granted the Trust a loan facility of up to £46,000 to cover any shortfall in the Trust finances, caused by the extra expense on the chassis.

Restoration work started in early 2011. The Trust's web-site has details of the latest developments and news is also posted on the LNER Encyclopedia's Forum page and on RMWeb. Videos of the testing of the new powerunit and chassis on the Great Central Railway (preserved) are posted on YouTube - the 'official' one is at https://www.youtube.com/watch?v=N99dUPMQar8. There is another shot by our test-driver at https://www.youtube.com/watch?v=tONHtVfQ9MA which includes rail-level footage.

In addition to the autocar, the Trust has restored an NER 'autocoach', which was kindly donated to the Trust by the NER coach group at the North Yorkshire Moors Railway. This was stabled at Levisham for many years, but is now (September 2018) substantially restored.

Brake tests on the autocar were carried out on the Embsay and Bolton Abbey Steam Railway during September and October 2018. The autocar officially re-entered service on Friday 19 October 2018. Both vehicles are expected to operate regular public service in early 2019.

The Trust is always looking for volunteers or members to support the project either by working on restoration/maintenance, as 'hosts'/'explainers' to passengers, on 'back room' tasks or via a financial donation.

Modelling the autocar
Following the renewed interest in the petrol-electric autocars after the founding of the Trust, two manufacturers make model kits of the autocars. In 2 mm and 4 mm (OO Gauge) scales, Worsley Works makes an etched brass kit of the body. 3 mm scale etches have also been produced to order. In 7 mm (O Gauge), NER Days makes a kit in nickel-silver. A series of articles was written about the construction of one of these by a Trust member in the quarterly newsletter (issues 7 - 16) back copies of which can be downloaded from the membership page.

Rails of Sheffield in partnership with Heljan are producing an rtr Model of the NER Autocars in 00 Gauge. Covering Their NER and LNER conditions. 
Three are to be produced covering: 
3170 in NER Red/Cream (1904-1923), 3171 in NER Red/Cream (1904-1930), 3170 in LNER Brown (1923-1931)

See also
 British railcars and diesel multiple units

References

Sources

Further reading

External links
 The 1903 Petrol Electric Autocar Trust
 Embsay and Bolton Abbey Railway

Autocar
North Eastern Railway (UK)